Bidstup may refer to:

As a surname:
Herluf Bidstrup (1912- 1988), Danish cartoonist and artist
Graham Bidstrup, Australian musician, songwriter, music producer and artist manager
 Alix Bidstrup (b. 1983), Australian actress
Jane Bidstrup  (b. 1955), Danish curler
Mathias Bidstrup (1852– 1929), a Danish architect
Stefan Bidstrup, Danish footballer

Other:
 3246 Bidstrup, main-belt Asteroid